László Nieberl is a Hungarian sprint canoeist who competed in the mid-1980s. He won two medals at the ICF Canoe Sprint World Championships with a silver (K-1 10000 m: 1985) and a bronze (K-4 10000 m: 1986).

Later he became the first trainer of the olimpic winner Hungarian canoeist Kammerer Zoltán

References

Hungarian male canoeists
Living people
Year of birth missing (living people)
ICF Canoe Sprint World Championships medalists in kayak
20th-century Hungarian people